De Morgan or de Morgan is a surname, and may refer to:
Augustus De Morgan (1806–1871), British mathematician and logician.
 De Morgan's laws (or De Morgan's theorem), a set of rules from propositional logic.
 The De Morgan Medal, a triennial mathematics prize awarded by the London Mathematical Society.
 William De Morgan (1839–1917), English designer, potter, ceramics-worker, and novelist.
 Evelyn De Morgan (1855–1919), English pre-Raphaelite painter.
 Jacques de Morgan (1857–1924), French archaeologist.